The 2007 ADAC Procar Series season was the thirteenth season of the ADAC Procar Series, the German championship for Super 2000 cars. The season consisted of eight separate race weekends with two races each (except for the first round at Nürburgring which was one double-distance race), spread over five different tracks. The championship was won by touring car veteran Franz Engstler for the second time.

Teams and drivers

Race calendar and results

Championship standings

References

External links
 Official ADAC Procar Series website

ADAC Procar Series
ADAC Procar Series seasons